Pycroft is a surname. Notable people with the surname include:

 Andy Pycroft (born 1956), Zimbabwean cricketer
 James Pycroft (1813–1895), British writer
 Arthur Pycroft (1875–1971), New Zealand ornithologist

Fictional characters:
 Hall Pycroft, character in "The Adventure of the Stockbroker's Clerk", a Sherlock Holmes story by Arthur Conan Doyle

See also
 Pycroft's petrel